Hyperinae is a subfamily of true weevils. Species are sometimes placed in Molytinae.

References

External links 
 
 
 Hyperinae at insectoid.info

 
Polyphaga subfamilies